Die Screaming, Marianne (also Die, Beautiful Marianne) is a 1971 British thriller film produced and directed by Pete Walker. Although Walker's films were mostly in the horror or sexploitation genres, this is a straight thriller, with mild horror undertones.

Plot 
Marianne, a nightclub dancer, is on the run from her father, a retired corrupt judge who lives in a villa in Portugal with Marianne's half-sister Hildegarde. On her 21st birthday, Marianne will receive her mother's inheritance, which is tied up in a Swiss bank account and includes legal papers incriminating her father. The Judge and Hildegarde seek the account number from Marianne so that they can access and dispose of this evidence.

While evading The Judge's henchmen, Marianne encounters Sebastian, who seduces her and persuades her to marry him. On the wedding day, Marianne suddenly suspects Sebastian's motives and sabotages the ceremony by tricking the registry office into thinking that she is really marrying Eli Frome, Sebastian's best man, and putting Eli's name on the marriage certificate instead of Sebastian's. Marianne leaves Sebastian and she and Eli become romantically involved. Sebastian, who is actually Hildegarde's lover, travels to Portugal and informs The Judge of Marianne's marriage to Eli. The Judge promises Sebastian a large amount of money if he can bring Marianne to Portugal.

Eli is abducted by two of The Judge's men but gets away after stabbing one of them in the chest. Sebastian returns and Marianne, wanting to make peace with her father, willingly flies to Portugal with Sebastian and Eli. At the villa, a deadly game of cat-and-mouse ensues as Sebastian and Hildegarde attempt to torture the account number out of Marianne by locking her in an overheated sauna. Not wanting Marianne hurt, The Judge drives away to get help but is killed when he loses control of his car (whose brakes Sebastian has sabotaged) and plunges off a cliff, crashing into the rocks below.

Marianne breaks out of the sauna and evades Sebastian and Hildegarde. Sebastian kills Eli and then, with Hildegarde, lures Marianne to an abandoned nunnery. Marianne fights both of them off and Sebastian, giving chase, is seriously injured when he falls through a weakened floor into an old cellar. Leaving Sebastian to die, Hildegarde returns to the villa only to be strangled by Rodriguez, The Judge's loyal manservant. Rodriguez and a tearful Marianne wait for the police to arrive.

Cast
 Susan George as Marianne
 Barry Evans as Eli Frome
 Chris Sandford as Sebastian 
 Judy Huxtable as Hildegarde 
 Leo Genn as The Judge
 Kenneth Hendel as Rodriguez 
 Paul Stassino as Portuguese Police Sergeant 
 Alan Curtis as Disco Manager 
 Anthony Sharp as Registrar
 John Laurimore
 Martin Wyldeck

Production

Filming locations
The film was shot on location in England and Portugal.

Music
The music was composed and conducted by Cyril Ornadel.

Release

Critical response
Andrew Dowler of the Toronto Now writes that Die Screaming, Marianne begins well but "founders in an exposition quagmire until the not-particularly-shocking climax". Gary A. Smith sums up the film as a "fairly cheesy affair" despite "some effective sequences".

Ian Jane of DVD Talk praises Susan George's performance and regards the film as a well-paced "decent little thriller, even if there are a few too many loose ends for its own good". Troy Howarth praises the film's dark humour and describes some of its set pieces as "marvellous" but concludes that it "ultimately strains under the weight of its own excess" and ends up being "less than the sum of its parts". He regards the film as exposition-heavy and over-long, arguing that it "suffers from Walker's tendency toward over-stuffing his movies with incident".

Home media

External links

References

1970s crime thriller films
1971 films
1971 crime films
1971 independent films
British crime thriller films
British independent films
Films about dysfunctional families
Films directed by Pete Walker
Films set in England
Films set in Portugal
Films shot in England
Films shot in Portugal
Films shot in the Algarve
1970s English-language films
1970s British films